SS Cambridge was a refrigerated steam cargo liner that was built in Germany for the Hamburg America Line. She was launched in 1916 as Vogtland, but after the 1919 Treaty of Versailles the United Kingdom took her as war reparations and sold her to the Federal Steam Navigation Company, who renamed her Cambridge. She operated between Britain and Australasia until 1940, when a German mine sank her off the coast of Australia.

Building
Joh. C. Tecklenborg built Vogtland in Geestemünde as yard number 271. She was launched on 9 December 1916 but the war delayed her completion. Her sea trials were on 27 November 1919.

Her holds had  of refrigerated cargo space.

Vogtland had two screws, each driven by a triple expansion engine. The ship had one funnel and four masts.

Vogtland was built for the Hamburg America Line, but when she was completed the UK Government seized her under Article 231 of the Treaty of Versailles. She was given the UK official number 144589 and code letters KFNP.

Federal Steam fleet
Federal Steam lost three cargo ships to enemy action in the First World War. Vogtland was one of five new German ships that the UK government supplied to Federal Steam as reparations. Federal Steam named its ships after English counties or county towns. It renamed the ship Cambridge.

Federal Steam operated a cargo liner service between New Zealand, Australia and the UK, bringing refrigerated produce to the UK and general cargo to Australia and New Zealand.

In 1934 the call sign GDFR replaced her code letters.

Second World War service
In the Second World War Cambridge continued her regular trade between New Zealand, Australia and the UK. She sailed mostly unescorted, with convoy protection only in the North Atlantic. She used both the Cape of Good Hope route via South Africa and the trans-Pacific route via the Panama Canal.

Loss
In August and September 1940 Cambridge was in South Wales. She called at Cardiff, Newport and Swansea. On 9 September 1940 she left Milford Haven with Convoy OB 211. She called at Cape Town on 9–10 October, Adelaide on 2–3 November and Melbourne on 5–7 November. She left Melbourne bound for Sydney and Brisbane.

The mine struck the after part of the ship, flooding her engine room.

The flood disabled the ship's electricity generators, and hence her main wireless transmitter. Her wireless operator used her emergency wireless set to transmit a distress signal. There was no reply. Cambridges Master, Captain Paddy Angell, ordered his crew to abandon ship.

Three of Cambridges lifeboats were launched. Her carpenter, J Kinnear, returned to his cabin to retrieve money. He failed to escape, and his crewmates' efforts to rescue him were unsuccessful. Kinnear was the only fatality. Cambridge sank, stern-first, in 45 minutes.

The auxiliary minesweeper  rescued the occupants of the three lifeboats and took them to Port Welshpool.

Cambridge was one of the first ships to be sunk by enemy action in Australian waters in the Second World War.

Wreck
Cambridges wreck was found in 1988. It is protected by the Commonwealth of Australia's Historic Shipwrecks Act 1976.

See also

References

Bibliography

1916 ships
Maritime incidents in November 1940
Ships built in Bremen (state)
Ships sunk by mines
Shipwrecks of Victoria (Australia)
Steamships of Germany
Steamships of the United Kingdom
World War II merchant ships of the United Kingdom
World War II shipwrecks in the Pacific Ocean